George Gonzales may refer to:
 George Abrán Gonzales, mayor of Santa Fe, New Mexico
 George Washington Gonzales, mayor of Hoboken, New Jersey